The Voice of Poland (season 5) began airing 6 September 2014 on TVP 2.

For this season, teams increased to 13 artists, up from 12 last season. "The Cross-Battles" were introduced in the semifinal.

Hosts and coaches

There had been rumours that Justyna Steczkowska and Marek Piekarczyk will not be returning for the fifth season. Halina Mlynkova, Grzegorz Skawiński and Janusz Panasewicz were said to join the judging panel. On 14 July 2014, it was announced that Marek Piekarczyk would be leaving the show. Maria Sadowska would be leaving the show too - she announced it on her fanpage on 15 July 2014. On 24 July 2014, Marika announced that she will not be returning for her fourth season as a host. On 26 July 2014 it was revealed that the judges will be Justyna Steczkowska, Tomson & Baron, Marek Piekarczyk and Edyta Górniak, who was a judge on season three. Despite information about Marek Piekarczyk's departure, he will return for his fourth season. On 7 August 2014 it was revealed, that Magdalena Mielcarz, who served as a host in season one, will return to the show replacing Marika.

Auditions
Auditions took place on 13, 14, 27 and 28 June and 5 July 2014 in Warsaw.

Teams
Color key

Blind auditions
The blind auditions were taped from 14 to 17 August 2014.

Color keys

Episode 1 (September 6, 2014) 
The coaches performed "Tysiące głosów", polish version of "One Thousand Voices", at the start of the show.

Episode 2 (September 6, 2014)

Episode 3 (September 13, 2014)

Episode 4 (September 13, 2014)

Episode 5 (September 20, 2014)

Episode 6 (September 20, 2014)

Episode 7 (September 27, 2014)

Episode 8 (September 27, 2014)

Episode 9 (October 4, 2014)

Episode 10 (October 4, 2014)

The Battle rounds
The Battle rounds will be taped from 16 to 18 September 2014.

Color keys

Episode 11 (October 11, 2014)

Episode 12 (October 18, 2014)

Episode 13 (October 25, 2014)

The Knockouts

Before each knockout round the coach chooses two artists from their team to get a "fast pass" to the live shows, the remaining six artists from that team are then split up into two groups of three. At the end of each knockout round the coach then decides out of the three artists who wins, and therefore makes up their four artists to take to the live shows.

Episode 14 (November 8, 2014)
Color keys

Live Shows

Color keys

Episode 15 (November 15, 2014)

Episode 16 (November 22, 2014)

Episode 17 (November 29, 2014) 
With the eliminations of Natalia Lubrano and Justyna Janik, Tomson & Baron had no more artists on their team, which marks the only season (so far) where a coach did not have an artist in the finale. With the advancement of Aleksandra Nizio and Gracjan Kalandyk, Steczkowska became the only coach that got more than one artist in the finale.

Final (December 6, 2014)

Results summary of live shows
Color keys
Artist's info

Result details

 Marta 'Sarsa' Markiewicz had to withdraw due to health problems. Justyna Janik took her place in the semifinal.

 Marek tried to steal the participants despite the lack of vacancies on his team.

Ratings

References

The Voice of Poland
2014 Polish television seasons